The decade of the 1110s in art involved some significant events.

Events

Works

 1110: Wiligelmo completes the Adam and Eve marble relief sculpture on Modena Cathedral
 1113
 Unknown artist completes a mosaic of Saint Demetrius of Thessaloniki for St. Michael's Golden-Domed Monastery in Kiev
 Unknown artist(s) completes the Gloucester Candlestick
 Wang Ximeng (aged 18) completes painting the scroll A Thousand Li of Rivers and Mountains
 1118: Unknown artist completes the baptismal font at St Bartholomew's Church, Liège

Births

Deaths
 1112 Benedict of Cagliari - Benedictine Bishop of Dolia, Sardinia
 1119: Wang Ximeng - Chinese court painter of the Northern Song period (born 1096)

Art
Decades of the 12th century in art